Michael David Resnik (born March 20, 1938) is a leading contemporary American philosopher of mathematics.

Biography
Resnik obtained his B.A. in mathematics and philosophy at Yale University in 1960, and his PhD in Philosophy at Harvard University in 1964. He wrote his thesis on Frege. He was appointed Associate Professor at the University of North Carolina at Chapel Hill in 1967, Professor in 1975, and University Distinguished Professor in 1988. He is Professor Emeritus of University of North Carolina at Chapel Hill and currently resides in rural Chatham County, North Carolina.

Publications

Books

Journal articles

References

External links 
 Philpapers.org
 Home page of Michael_Resnik

1938 births
20th-century American philosophers
American logicians
American science writers
Analytic philosophers
Harvard University alumni
Living people
Writers from New Haven, Connecticut
Philosophers of mathematics
Structuralism (philosophy of mathematics)
University of North Carolina at Chapel Hill faculty
Yale University alumni